Charles Anderton may refer to:

Sir Charles Anderton, 2nd Baronet (1657–1691) of the Anderton baronets
Sir Charles Anderton, 3rd Baronet (1677–1705) of the Anderton baronets
Charles Anderton (rugby union) (1868–1959), England rugby player

See also
Charles Anderson (disambiguation)
Anderton (disambiguation)